Christopher Lloyd (born June 18, 1960) is an American television producer and screenwriter. Lloyd is the co-creator and executive producer of the ABC mockumentary family sitcom Modern Family, which he co-created and produced with Steven Levitan. Lloyd has had an extensive career on many series, primarily Frasier.

Lloyd has won 12 Primetime Emmy Awards for his work on Modern Family and Frasier. He holds the record for Primetime Emmy awards as either a comedy or drama series producer.

Career
Lloyd began screenwriting with the first four seasons of The Golden Girls. He then wrote for the comedy Wings; then Frasier, where he became its showrunner. While he was executive producer, Frasier won the Primetime Emmy Award for Outstanding Comedy Series for five consecutive years, the first time any series had done so. Lloyd left Frasier after its seventh season, then returned to helm its final (eleventh) season. He then produced the series Out of Practice (where he first worked with Modern Family Ty Burrell); Back To You; and Modern Family, which also won the Emmy Award for Outstanding Comedy Series for five consecutive years. As a screenwriter, Lloyd's work includes the animated feature film Flushed Away (2006), for which he received an Annie Award. In 2000, he received an overall deal at Paramount. He quit in 2006 to join Fox in partnership with Steven Levitan.

Personal life
Lloyd is the son of Arline and sitcom writer David Lloyd (1934–2009). Since 1995, he has been married to actress, writer, and voiceover performer Arleen Sorkin, with whom he has two sons, Eli and Owen.

Filmography

Writing credits
 The Golden Girls
 "Second Motherhood"
 “'Twas the Nightmare Before Christmas” 
 "The Sisters"
 "Dorothy's Prized Pupil"
 "Nothing to Fear But Fear Itself"
 "Strange Bedfellows"
 "The Artist"
 "Mixed Blessings"
 "The One That Got Away"
 "Scared Straight"
 "Blind Date"
 "Little Sister"

 Wings
 "Marriage, Italian Style"
 "The Taming of the Shrew"
 "Take My Life, Please"
 "Lifeboat"
 "It May Have Happened One Night"
 "Goodbye Old Friend"

 Frasier
 "I Hate Frasier Crane"
 "Miracle on Third or Fourth Street"
 "Flour Child"
 "Fool Me Once, Shame on You..."
 "Dark Victory"
 "Shrink Rap"
 "Moon Dance" (with Joe Keenan, Rob Greenberg, Jack Burditt, Chuck Ranberg, Anne Flett-Giordano, Linda Morris and Vic Rauseo won for Outstanding Writing for a Comedy Series at 48th Primetime Emmy Awards)
 "The Show Where Diane Comes Back"
 "Mixed Doubles"
 "The 1000th Show" (with Joe Keenan)
 "Perspectives on Christmas"
 "Good Grief"
 "Rivals"
 "Something Borrowed, Someone Blue" (with Joe Keenan)
 "High Holidays"
 "Goodnight, Seattle" (with Joe Keenan) (Series Finale)

Modern Family
 "Pilot" (with Steven Levitan and won for Episodic Comedy at Writers Guild of America Awards 2009 and Outstanding Writing for a Comedy Series at the 62nd Primetime Emmy Awards)
 "Coal Digger"
 "Up All Night"
 "Manny Get Your Gun" (story credits)
 "Party Crasher" (with Danny Zuker)"
 "The Feud" (story credits)
 "The Wedding (Part 2)" (with Megan Ganz and Dan O'Shannon)
 "Legacy" (with Jack Burditt)
 "Finale" (with Jack Burditt, Elaine Ko, Danny Zucker, Vali Chandrasekaran, Brad Walsh and Paul Corrigan)

Producing credits
 Dream for an Insomniac (1996)

References

External links
 
 

American male screenwriters
American television writers
Living people
People from Greater Los Angeles
Place of birth missing (living people)
Writers Guild of America Award winners
Showrunners
Annie Award winners
Primetime Emmy Award winners
American male television writers
1960 births